Wuhan duck refers to several dishes from the city of Wuhan, in Hubei Province, China. The dishes are specific parts of a duck, including the tongue, head, feet, liver, kidney, and most popularly, the neck, often referred to as "spicy duck neck". Common to all of these dishes is the colour, a deep reddish-brown, and the extremely spicy flavour. These items are sold in numerous provinces throughout China.

See also

 Hubei cuisine
 List of duck dishes

References

External links
Images of Duck's neck

Duck dishes
Hubei cuisine
Wuhan